Lepidolopha is a genus of flowering plants in the daisy family.

 Species
 Lepidolopha fedtschenkoana Knorring
 Lepidolopha gomolitzkii Kovalevsk. & N.A.Safralieva
 Lepidolopha karatavica Pavlov
 Lepidolopha komarowii C.Winkl.
 Lepidolopha krascheninnikovii Czil. ex Kovalevsk. & N.A.Safralieva
 Lepidolopha mogoltavica (Krasch.) Krasch.
 Lepidolopha nuratavica Krasch.
 Lepidolopha talassica Kovalevsk. & N.A.Safralieva

References

Anthemideae
Asteraceae genera